Last Moment of Clarity is a 2020 American neo-noir thriller film written and directed by James and Colin Krisel, in their directorial debuts. It stars Samara Weaving, Carly Chaikin, Zach Avery, and Brian Cox.

The film was released on May 19, 2020, by Lionsgate.

Cast
 Zach Avery as Sam
 Brian Cox as Gilles
 Udo Kier as Ivan
 Samara Weaving as Georgia
 Carly Chaikin as Kat
 Hal Ozsan as Vince
 Pasha D. Lychnikoff as Karl
 Alex Fernandez as Bill Rice
 Karl E. Landler as Pierre

Production
In February 2018, it was announced Samara Weaving, Carly Chaikin, Zach Avery, Brian Cox, Udo Kier and Hal Ozsan had joined the cast of the film, with James and Colin Krisel directing from a screenplay they wrote.

Principal photography began in February 2018 in Norfolk, Virginia.

References

External links
 
 
 

2020 films
2020 directorial debut films
2020 thriller films
American neo-noir films
American thriller films
Films shot in Virginia
Lionsgate films
2020s English-language films
2020s American films